The 2011 Campeonato Estadual da Serie A de Profissionais do Rio de Janeiro was the 110th edition of the top tier football in Rio de Janeiro. It was organized by the Federação de Futebol do Estado do Rio de Janeiro (FERJ). The competition began 19 January and ended on 15 May. Botafago were the title defenders.

Format
The sixteen clubs were divided into two groups that played in two tournaments:  Taça Guanabara and Taça Rio. In Taça Guanabara, the teams from each group played the teams within their group in a single round-robin tournament. The two top placed teams from each group advanced to the playoffs and the next two placed teams played Troféu Washington Rodrigues. In Taça Rio, the teams of one group played the teams in the other group in a single round-robin format.  The two top placed teams from each group advanced to the playoffs and the next two placed teams from each group contested Troféu Carlos Alberto Torres. The winning teams of Taça Guanabara and Taça Rio played for the state title. The team that won both tournaments were by fault awarded the title.

Qualifications
The best two teams not qualified to 2012 Copa Libertadores qualified for 2012 Copa do Brasil. The best team not playing in Campeonato Brasileiro Série A, B, or C qualified for 2011 Campeonato Brasileiro Série D

Participating teams

Taça Guanabara
The 2011 Taça Guanabara began on 19 January and ended on 27 February. Flamengo won their 19th Taça Guanabara and qualified to the state finals.

First stage

Group A

Group B

Troféu Washington Rodrigues

Playoffs

Bracket

Semifinals

Final

Taça Rio

First stage

Group A

Group B

Troféu Carlos Alberto Torres

Playoffs

Bracket

Semifinals

Final

Overall standings

See also
2011 Copa Rio

References

External links
Official webpage 

Campeonato Carioca seasons
Carioca